Ente Entethu Mathrem is a 1986 Indian Malayalam family drama film directed by J. Sasikumar and written by Kaloor Dennis from a story by A. R. Mukesh. The film stars Mohanlal, Karthika, Baby Shalini and Lalu Alex. The film has music composed by Johnson.

Plot
The movie starts with Bindu going home to visit her sick mother. She collects flowers to give to her mother. At the hospital her mother gets a new doctor and her father tells the doctor about his wife's story. Menon owns a construction company. He has daughter Sreekutty. His wife died during childbirth. Sreekutty craves to have a mother like all her classmates. Sheela is Menon's newly appointed P.A. Sreekutty and Sheela soon starts to have close bond and Sreekutty takes sheela to her school on mother's day and introduces sheela as her mother. Seeing their close relationship Menon asks Sheela to marry him, but she refuses him since she is already engaged. Sheela's wedding date is fixed and she invites Menon and Sreekutty to her wedding. But soon Sreekutty gets bitten by their dog who has rabbies and is hospitalised. Hearing this news Sheela comes back to take care of Sreekutty and she asks her mother to postpone the wedding so she can take care of sreekutty. Sreekutty recovers under Sheela's care and she goes back to her home for wedding. But when she goes back she learns that her fiancé has married another women. After that Sheela and Menon gets married. The duo with Sreekutty leads a happy life. But after the birth of Sheela's first child things began to change. Sreekutty becomes jealous of all the attention the baby is getting. Things gets worse and one day Sreekutty rans away from the house amidst an argument towards Menon's work site and accidentally dies. Witnessing this Sheela becomes mentally and physically sick. Years go by and Menon and Sheela's daughter Bindu is studying at a convent boarding school. She has an uncanny resemblance to Sreekutty. On vacation Bindu goes home to visit her mother and she is very excited. But by the time Bindu reaches Sheela, her condition gets worse and she dies.

Cast
Mohanlal as Menon
Karthika as Sheela
Shobana as Ambili
Baby Shalini as Sreemol, Bindu (double role)
Lalu Alex as Gauthaman
Mala Aravindan as Sathyasheelan
Innocent as Vakkachan
Sukumari as Padmavathi/Sheela's mother
Valsala Menon as Mother Superior
Santhakumari as Kalyaniyamma
Lalithasree as Rudrani
James as Mathai

Soundtrack
The music was composed by Johnson and the lyrics were written by R. K. Damodaran.

References

External links
 

1986 films
1980s Malayalam-language films
Indian romantic drama films
Films directed by J. Sasikumar